Jadunathpur Union is a union of Dhanbari Upazila, Tangail District, Bangladesh.

Demographics
According to the 2011 Bangladesh census, Jadunathpur Union had 1,241 households and a population of 30,392. The literacy rate (age 7 and over) was 44.9% (male: 46.9%, female: 43%).

See also
 Union Councils of Tangail District

References

Populated places in Tangail District
Unions of Dhanbari Upazila